Bug is a play by American playwright Tracy Letts. Exploring themes of paranoia and conspiracy theories, the play tells the story of a woman who, as she spends time with a newly acquainted man in her motel room, starts sharing more and more of his paranoias. It premiered in London 1996, and was also performed around the United States between 2000 and 2004.

The play was adapted into a film of the same name directed by William Friedkin in 2006, with Letts writing the screenplay and Michael Shannon, who had played the male lead role of Peter in the original London production and in some American versions, reprising his role.

Synopsis 
Most of the play takes place in a seedy motel room. Lonely cocktail waitress Agnes lives there, hiding from her violent ex-husband Jerry Goss, an ex-con. One night, her lesbian biker friend R.C. introduces her to Peter, a Gulf War veteran who might be AWOL. She gets involved with Peter, who grows increasingly paranoid about the war in Iraq, UFOs, the Oklahoma City bombing of the federal building, cult suicides, and secret government experiments on soldiers. He eventually draws Agnes into his delusions. The play explores issues of love, paranoia, conspiracy theories, and Agnes's slow descent into insanity under Peter's influence.

Production history

London premiere
The play originally premiered at the Gate Theatre in Notting Hill, London, on September 20, 1996. The rehearsals were at A Red Orchid Theatre in Chicago, Illinois.
Shannon Cochran - Agnes White
Michael Shannon - Peter Evans

American premieres
Following its London run, the play made its U.S. debut at Ithaca, New York, followed by the Woolly Mammoth Theatre Company in Washington, D.C.

In Washington, DC, the play underwent a series of revisions and received an American premiere at Woolly Mammoth Theatre Company in March/April 2000.

Opening Date: March 18, 2000
Closing Date: April 16, 2000
Director: Wilson Milam
Deborah Hazlett - Agnes
Eric Sutton - Peter
Steve Schmidt- Jerry
Kate Eastwood Norris - R.C.
Brian Hemmingsen - Dr. Sweet

The play's Chicago Premiere was at A Red Orchid Theatre, where the play first rehearsed prior to its world premiere in London.

Opening Date: August 20, 2001
Closing Date: October 28, 2001
Director: Dexter Bullard
Kate Buddeke - Agnes
Michael Shannon - Peter
Guy Van Swearingen III - Jerry
Robin Witt - R.C.
Troy West - Dr. Sweet

Off-Broadway
Barrow Street Theatre, New York City, New York
Opening Date: February 29, 2004
Closing Date: January 30, 2005
Director: Dexter Bullard
Shannon Cochran - Agnes
Michael Shannon - Peter
Michael Cullen - Jerry
Amy Landecker - R.C.
Reed Birney - Dr. Sweet

Amanda Plummer resigned from the Off-Broadway premiere 24 hours before its February 21 start date. A notice in the theater box office warned that the show contained nudity, violence and cigarette smoking.

Australia
The play premiered at The SBW Stables Theatre in Kings Cross, Sydney, in May 2010, as part of Griffin Theatre Company's Independent Season 2010, in conjunction with Picture This Productions.
Opening Date: 12 May 2010
Closing Date: 5 June 2010
Director: Anthony Skuse
Jeanette Cronin - Agnes
Matthew Walker - Peter
Jonny Pasvolsky - Jerry
Catherine Terracini - R.C.
Laurence Coy - Dr. Sweet

Film adaptation

A film version of the play was released in 2006 from Lionsgate. It was directed by William Friedkin, and starred Ashley Judd, Harry Connick, Jr and Michael Shannon. Friedkin contacted Tracy Letts after having seen the play, and they cooperated on a screen adaptation. Friedkin described the film as "the most intense piece of work I've ever done". Michael Shannon had played the part on stage. Lionsgate wanted to cast an actor with more name recognition, but Friedkin was determined to have Shannon perform in the film, saying he brought a unique quality to the part.

Awards and nominations

References

Further reading

External links

1996 plays
Plays by Tracy Letts
Obie Award-winning plays
American plays adapted into films